Multifocal stenosing ulceration of the small intestine is a rare condition that is characterised by recurrent ulcers of the small intestine.

Presentation

The clinical features of this condition are variable. Features associated with it include:
 Abdominal pain
 Abdominal distension
 Fatigue
 Weight loss
 Fever
 Malaise
 Joint symptoms

Faecal occult blood testing is usually positive.

Laboratory investigations normally show anaemia and low albumin.

Cause

A mutation in the cytosolic phospholipase A2-α gene (PLA2G4A) has been identified as the cause of this disease in one family. In this family the mutation was inherited as an autosomal recessive. It is not yet known if this gene is the cause of this disease in other families.

The gene encoding cytosolic phospholipase A2-α is found on chromosome 1. Cytosolic phospholipase A2-α acts on membrane phospholipids to release arachidonic acid a precursor in the synthesis of eicosanoids. The eicosanoids are involved in multiple regulatory pathways.

Pathology

This disease is characterised by multifocal stenosing ulceration of the small intestine. The ulcers are circular or irregular in shape and their margins are always clear. The intervening mucosa appears normal. The lesions involve only the mucosa and submucosa and are confined to the jejunum and proximal ileum. Nonspecific inflammatory changes are present. Giant cells or other typical features of granulomatous inflammation are not found. Multiple stenoses are typically present (mean 8: range 1-25).

Diagnosis

This may be difficult given the non specific nature of the presenting symptoms and the rarity of the condition itself. It is normally made by the combination of the clinical picture, endoscopic findings and typical histology. Radiology may also be helpful. Other conditions such as infections and vasculitis should be ruled out with the relevant laboratory investigations.

Differential diagnosis
 Idiopathic ulcerative jejunoileitis
 Lymphoma
 Infectious agents (Campylobacter, Salmonella, Shigella, Yersinia and others)
 Infections in the immunosuppressed with unusual organisms
 Tropheryma whipplei, Mycobacterium avium intracellulare
 Drug induced (nonsteroidal anti-inflammatory drugs, gold, potassium, chemotherapy)
 Zollinger-Ellison syndrome
 Heterotopic functioning gastric mucosa
 Meckel's diverticulum
 Crohn's disease
 Traumatic injury (surgical, seat belt injury, endoscopic biopsy, cautery during endoscopy, foreign body ingestion particularly batteries)
 Ischemia
 Thrombotic diseases
 Degos disease
 Pseudoxanthoma elasticum
 Myeloproliferative disorders
 Antithrombin III deficiency
 Vasculitis
 Coeliac disease
 Behçet's disease

Treatment

Steroids seem to relieve the symptoms but long term treatment may be required. Other immunosuppressants appear to be less effective. Surgery may be curative in ~40% but a second operation may be required later.

Prognosis

This condition may be lifelong. Although not normally fatal it may necessitate admission to hospital for transfusions, control of bleeding or other complications. Because of its rarity to date there have been no controlled trials. Treatment remains empirical and symptomatic.

History

This disease was first recognised in 1959. It was redescribed and named 'cryptogenetic plurifocal ulcerative stenosing enteritis' in 1964.

References

Abdominal pain
Inflammations
Noninfective enteritis and colitis